Eugenio Mastrandrea (born circa 1994) is an Italian actor known for his role as Lino in the 2022 Netflix series From Scratch. 

Mastrandrea was born in Rome, Italy.  He graduated from the acclaimed Silvio D’amico National Academy of Dramatic Arts.

In 2012, he appeared in the 2012 film A.C.A.B as Giancarlo and in the 2021 Italian television series La Fuggitiva as Marcello Favini.

In 2022, Mastrandrea made his American debut in the Netflix series From Scratch, playing the lead role of Lino Ortolano opposite Zoe Saldaña.  He will appear in the film The Equalizer 3 with Denzel Washington'' which was filming in Italy in 2022.

References

External links

 

1994 births
21st-century Italian actors
Actors from Rome
Italian film actors
Italian stage actors
Italian television actors
Living people
Accademia Nazionale di Arte Drammatica Silvio D'Amico alumni